The 1970 Kansas City Royals season was their second in Major League Baseball. The Royals finished tied for fourth place with the Milwaukee Brewers in the American League West with a record of 65-97, 33 games behind the division champion Minnesota Twins. Charlie Metro took over as manager when Joe Gordon resigned after the Royals' initial season, but was replaced by Bob Lemon following a 19-33 start.  Bob Oliver hit a team-high 27 home runs, becoming the first Royals player to hit 20 or more home runs in a season.

Offseason 
 December 3, 1969: Joe Foy was traded by the Royals to the New York Mets for Amos Otis and Bob Johnson.
January 17, 1970: Greg Minton was drafted by the Royals in the third round of the 1970 Major League Baseball draft.

Regular season

Season standings

Record vs. opponents

Notable transactions 
 May 28, 1970: Mike Fiore was traded by the Royals to the Boston Red Sox for Tom Matchick.

Roster

Player stats

Batting

Starters by position 
Note: Pos = Position; G = Games played; AB = At bats; H = Hits; Avg. = Batting average; HR = Home runs; RBI = Runs batted in

Other batters 
Note: G = Games played; AB = At bats; H = Hits; Avg. = Batting average; HR = Home runs; RBI = Runs batted in

Pitching

Starting pitchers 
Note: G = Games pitched; IP = Innings pitched; W = Wins; L = Losses; ERA = Earned run average; SO = Strikeouts

Other pitchers 
Note: G = Games pitched; IP = Innings pitched; W = Wins; L = Losses; ERA = Earned run average; SO = Strikeouts

Relief pitchers 
Note: G = Games pitched; W = Wins; L = Losses; SV = Saves; ERA = Earned run average; SO = Strikeouts

Farm system

Notes

References 

1970 Kansas City Royals team page at Baseball Reference
1970 Kansas City Royals team page at www.baseball-almanac.com

Kansas City Royals seasons
Kansas City Royals season
Kansas City